South Korean Patent Act is a government enactment meant to facilitate technological development and contribute to industrial development of the entire South Korean republic.

History 
The Patent Act of Korea states in Article 1, “the purpose of this Act is to facilitate technological development and contribute to industrial development by protecting and encouraging invention and promoting its exploitation.” This indicates that “protection for the invention” and “inventive application” are two the central concept that is essential for the purpose development of the industry. Patent Act was implemented in Korea by Japan when Japan has invaded Korea after defeating China on August 29 in China/Russia – Japan War. After Japan won in World War 2 and when Korea regained independence, the Patents Administrative Incorporation Committee was founded on January 4, 1946, after that, the ‘Patents Office’ was established on January 22. Followed on October 15, 1946, the Patent Act was declared, the Utility Model Act and the Design Act was formed, including a legal system for industrial property. Korean Patent Act is unique while useful since it provides the same opportunity for all members in our global society, but not only limited to South Korean.

-1908: Korean patent promulgation

-1946: Establishment of patent office and establishment of patent law

-1961: Separation of Patent Law into Industrial Property Rights Act

-1977: Opened by the Patent Office

-1979: Joined the World Intellectual Property Organization (WIPO)

-1980: Participation in the Paris Convention

-1984: Participated in the Patent Cooperation Treaty

Introduction to Korean Patent Act

Composition of the Korean Patent Act 
 The Act is composed 232 Articles, after the full amendment in 2017, the period for filing a patent application will be reduced from five years to three years, and a patent cancellation system will be introduced.
 This section describes the patent law of South Korea among the contents of the patent. The Korean Patent Act is described in the way how an invention is defined and what invention can be patented or not.

Purpose 

According to Article 1 of the Patent Law, protection of the invention is intended for the purpose of the law. Patent law is strongly influenced by national industrial policy or technology level due to the nature of the law. As technology develops over time and data related to judgments, judgments, and litigation accumulate, law amendments are frequent and are usually revised more than once a year.

Definitions

Patent inventions

Establishment of invention

Judgement of the formality of the invention 
a. Subjective standards

The examiner is judged at the examination stage, the judge agreement body at the judgment stage, and the judge at the court.

b. Object criteria

The invention is based on the device as outlined in the claims of the claims, taking into consideration the description of the invention and the drawings and taking the technical field into account.

c. Timely standard

Rule: it is judged based on the time of patent application in the examination process.

Establishment of the invention

Use of natural laws 
a. Natural Law

This includes various laws that describe the phenomena of the natural world, such as the physics and chemistry that people learn at school. Since permanent institutions ignore the first law of the thermodynamics and the second law of thermodynamics, until the exception of the above two requirements is scientifically proven, it can never be patented under Korean Patent Law.

b. Use

i. Use as a whole: The invention should be used as a whole of natural laws. In the patent act, if some of the constituent elements of the invention did not mention the natural law, is not treated as the natural law was used. (Except for inventions related to computer programs)

ii. Constant certainty and reproducibility: At the level of a person with ordinary skill to which the invention belongs, the invention must be able to repeat the same result with absolute certainty. It does not mean that confidence and reproducibility should be 100%. (However, in the invention of plants and microorganisms, it is more relaxed)

iii. Unnecessary recognition

It is not necessary for the inventor to have an accurate and complete awareness of the laws of nature. In other words, it is not required to know that falling water is caused by gravity in the invention of the spinning mill.

Use of technical thought (technical thinking) 
Technology means that it can be used as a concrete means for achieving a specific purpose. Thought refers to abstract and conceptual ideas. In patent act, inventions are not necessarily technical but only requires scientific ideas. Therefore, the invention must not be a simple “thought” until the filing date, and it must be a “technical idea.” Instead, when considering the scope of the right, it is desirable to protect the “technical idea” as a patent because it is likely that the range of the right can be narrowly interpreted it the application is made in the form of “technology.”

Creativity 
An invention must be made by human's artificial metal activity, and from this aspect, it is distinguished with ‘discovery.’ Discovery is to find the one that has already existed before, whereas inventions are fundamentally different in that they create new things that were never existed before.

Altitude 
It merely illustrates the higher level of creativity of technical thoughts. The purpose of the patent act is to define the concept of invention and to be highly sophisticated to distinguish it from the design of the utility model.

Statutory and non-statutory invention 
(Applicability indicates the usefulness of something for a particular task)

The Korean Patent Act defines the invention as follows.

Statutory inventions 
Under the Patent Act Article 2, "Invention means the highly advanced creation of a technical idea utilizing the laws of nature", the invention shall satisfy the provision in order for a filed patent application to be statutory under the Patent Act. (Definition of inventions from article 2 also applies equally to computer-implemented inventions.) However, the term "highly advanced" has been distinguishable to "device" under the Utility Model Act from "Invention" under the Patent Act, and this term is disobliged in deciding whether the invention is statutory or not.[5]

Non-statutory inventions 
a. Non-Invention: Natural law itself

b. Incomplete Invention: Only limited to mere discoveries but not creation.

It indicates the inventions which are uncompleted from the mere discoveries or mere invention of an idea. Explicitly, means for solving the problems of the invention are presented, but it is an incomplete invention when the issue of the invention is remarkably doubtful in the view of the natural law. Moreover, it is an unfinished invention that is uncertain about the future feasibility of technology at present. For instance, using the time machine as a stock trading methods cannot be determined by assuming that a time machine will be created in the future.

Novelty
“Article 29 (Requirements for Patent Registration)

<2> An invention published in a publication distributed in the Republic of Korea or in a foreign country or an invention disclosed to the public via telecommunications lines prior to the filling of a patent application.”

Novelty means a standard of developed invention that no one can easily imitate the invention. Thus, the invention claimed to be “novelty-lost” means that the invention has been performed publicly prior to the time of filing of the patent application, or that it has been released by telecommunication lines established by the distribution, publication and presidential decree.

There are four criteria for judging novelty:

i. Notification to the unspecified large number of people at home and abroad:

According to the precedent, a factory that has an invention has been visited by an unspecified number, even if it does not ask about the invention or show it directly.

ii. Performed at home and abroad:

According to the case, the invention of a new hybrid engine and the appearance of the car with this engine on the motor show is not a public announcement about the invention of the hybrid engine at home and abroad. The reason is that the motor show is an exhibition that displays the exterior and interior of the car, not an exhibition that opens the bonnet to the engine.

iii. Published in domestic and international publications

The Editorial Board or the Journal Editorial Board does not correspond to the unspecified majority mentioned here, and according to the precedent, from the time when the facts existed apart from reading the articles in the library.

iiii. Publicly available via telecommunication lines

Progressive
Notwithstanding paragraph (1), an invention easily creatable by a person with ordinary knowledge in the technical field of the invention, based on the invention referred to in any subparagraph of paragraph (1), before the filing of the patent application, shall not be patentable.

The term Progressive indicates that innovative technology has advanced to such an extent that another person having ordinary knowledge (ordinary skill) cannot easily follow the invention. That is to say, "there is no inventive step" means that the invention that can be facilitated by a person with ordinary knowledge from a technology disclosed before the time of patent application, which cannot be patented. This is usually judged that when there is no inventive step if the patent-pending invention is a replacement of some of the technologies which were disclosed before the patent application date with a well-known and self-evident technology, or a combination of multiple technologies revealed before the patent application point. Since there are many subjective factors involved in whether or not it can be easily invented, there is no perfect standard for whether or not there is inventiveness. Therefore, whether or not it can be quickly developed can be judged individually for each case.

In the case of Samsung v. Apple, the second patent lawsuit that followed was the victory of the last US federal Court of Appeals by invalidating Apple's patents for its inventiveness (non-obviousness as US patent law) (Currently, Apple objected to the invalidation and non-infringement, but it overturned it with a request for a consensus by the Supreme Court, and Samsung received a judgment against the infringement.) Samsung is currently filing an appeal with the Supreme Court of the United States, but it is not easy to get permission.

Invention of questionable form ability 
(It is not either statutory nor non-statutory)

The Korean patent law with the definition of the invention can be an advantage in terms of legal stability compared with other countries' patent law which does not have the description of the invention in terms of nature, but it is a disadvantage in terms of specific feasibility. In other words, it means that it is difficult to respond flexibly to the changing industries. Therefore, Korean patent law has a form in which legal stability is given priority, and concrete validity is supplemented.

See also 

Patent Law                    
Korean law
Creativity                      
Law
Technology                   
Invention                       
Science
Computer Science         
Intellectual property organizations

References 

Inventions
Law of South Korea
Patent law